Land of opportunity or land of opportunities may refer to:

Government and politics
 Land of Opportunity, a nickname for the United States, expressing belief in socioeconomic mobility in the United States
 Land of Opportunity, a former nickname of Arkansas, United States
 Land of Opportunity, a land policy of South Africa's Democratic Alliance party
Embu County, Kenya, whose motto is "The Land of Opportunities"

Music

Albums
Land of Opportunity, a 1986 album by EIEIO, published by Frontier Records

Songs
"Land of Opportunities", from the 1946 musical Park Avenue
"Land of Opportunity", by Charlie Daniels, from the 1974 album Way Down Yonder
"Land of Opportunity", by Steven Curtis Chapman, from the 1996 album Signs of Life
"Land of Opportunity", by A Great Big World, from the 2014 album Is There Anybody Out There?

Visual media

Film
Land of Opportunity, a 2007 documentary film
The Land of Opportunity, a 1920 film starring Ralph Ince
Land of Opportunity, a 1949–1950 documentary film series directed by William Witney
Land of Opportunities, an unfinished 21st-century film trilogy by Lars von Trier

Television
"Land of Opportunity", a 1996 episode of The Marshal
"Land of Opportunity", a 2006 episode of Close to Home
"Land of Opportunity", a 2017 episode of Hetty Feather
Land of Opportunities (TV series), a documentary series by Dubai 33

Other
 ("Land of opportunities"), a 2008 Icelandic crime fiction novel
Land of Opportunity: The Entrepreneurial Spirit in America, a 1986 book by Donald Lambro
A Land of Opportunity, a part of the 2019 game Red Dead Online

See also
Global Social Mobility Index, a ranking of intergenerational social mobility in different countries
Land of Freedom (disambiguation)
London streets are paved with gold